The MS Kronprins Frederik is a freight ferry that operates between Germany and Denmark.

History
The Kronprins Frederik was built in 1980 at the Nakskov Skibsværft in Nakskov. She entered service in April 1981 operating on the Nyborg - Korsør route.

Following the opening of the Great Belt Fixed Link in June 1997. The Kronprins Frederik and her sisters were laid up. In December 1997 the Kronprins Frederik was rebuilt and entered service on the Gedser - Rostock route. Since commissioning the two new ferries in 2017, she has been used as a freight ferry on the Puttgarden - Rodby route. The ship was therefore rebuilt in Poland.

Sisterships
The Kronprins Frederik is the third of three identical ships built for DSB. The other ships are the Dronning Ingrid and the Prins Joachim.

References

Ferries of Germany
Ferries of Denmark
Ships built in Denmark
1980 ships